Śri Maharaja Walaprabhu was the king of Bali between 1079 and 1088.

References
 Pringle, Robert. (2004) A Short History of Bali: Indonesia's Hindu Realm. Crows Nest, NSW: Allan & Unwin .

Indonesian Hindu monarchs
11th-century Indonesian people